João Leithardt Neto (6 January 1958 – 3 October 2015), nicknamed Kita, was a Brazilian footballer who played as a forward. He competed in the 1984 Summer Olympics with the Brazil national football team.

Kita died on 3 October 2015 at the age of 57 due to a generalized infection aggravated by liver cancer.

References

1958 births
2015 deaths
Deaths from cancer in Rio Grande do Sul
Association football forwards
Brazilian footballers
Olympic footballers of Brazil
Footballers at the 1984 Summer Olympics
Olympic silver medalists for Brazil
Olympic medalists in football
Sport Club Internacional players
CR Flamengo footballers
Associação Portuguesa de Desportos players
Grêmio Foot-Ball Porto Alegrense players
Club Athletico Paranaense players
Deaths from liver cancer
Medalists at the 1984 Summer Olympics